Karsten Finger (born 28 January 1970 in Berlin) is a German rower.

References 
 
 

1970 births
Living people
Rowers from Berlin
Rowers at the 1992 Summer Olympics
Olympic silver medalists for Germany
Olympic rowers of Germany
Olympic medalists in rowing
German male rowers
Medalists at the 1992 Summer Olympics